Cem Demir (born 30 April 1985) is a Turkish former footballer.

References

1985 births
People from Erzincan
Living people
Turkish footballers
Association football forwards
Trabzonspor footballers
Orduspor footballers
Adana Demirspor footballers
Kartalspor footballers
Turanspor footballers
Tokatspor footballers
Ofspor footballers
İnegölspor footballers
Kırklarelispor footballers
Batman Petrolspor footballers
Süper Lig players
TFF First League players
TFF Second League players